Cyrus M. Butt (September 30, 1833August 27, 1921) was an American farmer, lawyer, and politician.  He was a member of the Wisconsin State Senate during the 1869 and 1870 sessions, representing La Crosse and Vernon counties.  In historical documents, his name is often abbreviated as C. M. Butt.

Biography

Born in the township of Deerfield, Morgan County, Ohio, Butt moved to Viroqua, Wisconsin, in 1858 and was a farmer and lawyer. In 1859, Butt was elected district attorney for Vernon County, Wisconsin. Butt served in the 25th Wisconsin Volunteer Infantry Regiment and was commissioned colonel. In 1866, Butt was elected treasurer for Vernon County. He also served on the Viroqua village board and was president of the village. He also served on the school board and on the board of trustees for the Vernon County Asylum. In 1869 and 1860, Butt served in the Wisconsin State Senate. Butt died at his home in Viroqua, Wisconsin from a stroke.

References

External links

1833 births
1921 deaths
People from Morgan County, Ohio
People from Viroqua, Wisconsin
People of Wisconsin in the American Civil War
Union Army officers
Farmers from Wisconsin
Wisconsin lawyers
School board members in Wisconsin
Mayors of places in Wisconsin
Wisconsin city council members
Republican Party Wisconsin state senators
19th-century American lawyers